Mohammed Valli Moosa (born 9 February 1957 in Johannesburg) is a retired South African politician who was active in the United Democratic Front.

Political career
In the early 1990s, he participated for the ANC in the negotiations to end apartheid. In the government of national unity, he was Deputy Minister for Provincial Affairs and Constitutional Development (1994–1996), after the exodus of the National Party he became Minister in this department.

In 1999, he took office as the Environment and Tourism Minister of South Africa. In this position, he has worked to raise awareness of the problem of household litter, jokingly naming plastic shopping bags the "national flower" and pushing to introduce a minimum legal thickness of 30 micrometres to increase their cost, reusability, and recyclability.

Corporate and civil society involvement
He was elected President of IUCN – the World Conservation Union at the 3rd World Conservation Congress in Bangkok in November 2004. He was also the non-executive chairman of Eskom and Sun International.

In April 2013, he was appointed the independent non-executive chairman of Anglo American Platinum.

In December 2020, he was appointed as Deputy Chairperson of the Presidential Climate Commission (PCC). The PCC is a multi-lateral organisation in South Africa that advises on climate change policies that would enable a just transition to a low-carbon economy and society.

References

External links
African National Congress profile of Mohammed Valli Moosa

1957 births
Living people
African National Congress politicians
Members of the National Assembly of South Africa
Government ministers of South Africa
People from Johannesburg
Presidents of the International Union for Conservation of Nature